Born to Ride is a 1991 American action film directed by Graham Baker. The film was released on May 3, 1991 and starred John Stamos as a biker turned military corporal.

Synopsis
Colonel James E. Devers's (Sandy McPeak) newly converted motorcycle unit has had a lot of experience riding horses, but not much riding motorcycles. Enter Grady Westfall (John Stamos), a biker faced with the choice of prison or teaching the military how to ride. Grady quickly proves to be a headache for Colonel Devers, who dislikes both Grady's unorthodox methods and his interest in his daughter Beryl Ann (Teri Polo). But when Grady discovers that his unit is ill equipped to launch a rescue mission in Spain, he decides to accompany his unit in the hopes of increasing their chance of succeeding in the dangerous mission.

Cast
 John Stamos as Corporal Grady Westfall
 John Stockwell as Captain Jack Hassler
 Teri Polo as Beryl Ann Devers
 Sandy McPeak as Colonel James E. Devers (CO, 36th Div.)
 Kris Kamm as Bobby Novak
 Keith Cooke as Broadwater
 Dean Yacalis as Cartucci
 Salvator Xuereb as Levon
 Justin Lazard as Brooks
 Thom Mathews as Willis
 Garrick Hagon as Jim Bridges, State Department Official
 Matko Raguz as Esteban
 Lisa Orgolini as Claire Tate
 Ed Bishop as Dr. Tate
 Slavko Juraga as Captain Rosario

Reception
The film was largely panned upon its release, and Entertainment Weekly gave the movie a D+ rating and commented that it was "a big failure on the most basic dramatic level." In a 2009 article PopCrunch listed Stamos on their "20 Worst Action Film Stars of All Time" article for his role in Born to Ride.

Filming
Some scenes were filmed at Piran, now Slovenia (motorcycle race in Spain).

References

External links

1991 films
Warner Bros. films
Films directed by Graham Baker
Films scored by Shirley Walker
Films shot in Slovenia
1990s English-language films